Marakkillorikkalum is a 1983 Indian Malayalam-language drama film written and directed by Fazil, with dialogues written by S. L. Puram Sadanandan. It stars Prem Nazir, Shankar, Mohanlal, and Ambika  in the lead roles. The film has musical score by Zero Babu.

Plot

Pradeep (Shankar) and Suma (Ambika) are in love. Suma lives a fine life until she meets Murali (Mohanlal). Murali is a ruthless bully who tries to rape Suma. Madhavan Thampi and Pradeep defeat him in a fight and he never comes back. Pradeep and Suma have an affection toward each other. The film ends with Madhavan Thampi leaving Pradeep and Suma to live alone.

Cast 
Prem Nazir as Madhavan Thampi
Mohanlal as Murali
Shankar as Pradeep
Ambika as Suma
Kaviyoor Ponnamma as Sharada
Jagannatha Varma as Kesavan Nampoothiri
Alummoodan as Gopi
Poornima Bhagyaraj as Archana
Mammootty as Man at the park (uncredited)
Ansar Kalabhavan as Murali’s friend
Dominic Alummoodan as Gopi

Soundtrack 
The music was composed by Zero Babu and the lyrics were written by Jamal Kochangadi and Bichu Thirumala.

References

External links 
 

1980s Malayalam-language films
1983 action films
1983 films
Films directed by Fazil
Indian action films